Eucalyptus scias subsp. apoda is a rare Eucalyptus, growing at high altitudes in north-eastern New South Wales.

References

 A.G.Floyd - e-mail communication

scias subsp. apoda
Myrtales of Australia
Flora of New South Wales
Vulnerable flora of Australia
Trees of Australia
Plant subspecies